Birch Creek is a town in Chippewa County in the U.S. state of Wisconsin. The population was 517 at the 2010 census.

Geography
Birch Creek is in northern Chippewa County, bordered to the north by Rusk County. The Chippewa River forms the eastern border of the town.

History
The six mile square that would become the center of Birch Creek was first surveyed in June 1852 by a crew working for the U.S. government. That fall a different crew marked all the section corners of the township, walking through the woods and wading the swamps, measuring with chain and compass. When done, the deputy surveyor filed this general description:
The surface of this Township is generally rolling and the uplands fit for cultivation. The timber is chiefly pine Hemlock Cedar & Tamarac. There are several small Swamp all unfit for cultivation. The streams are all small branches. (?) Millery privileges in this Township.

Demographics

As of the census of 2000, there were 520 people, 212 households, and 157 families residing in the town. The population density was 11.7 people per square mile (4.5/km2). There were 389 housing units at an average density of 8.7 per square mile (3.4/km2). The racial makeup of the town was 98.65% White, and 1.35% from two or more races. Hispanic or Latino of any race were 0.19% of the population.

There were 212 households, out of which 25.9% had children under the age of 18 living with them, 65.6% were married couples living together, 4.7% had a female householder with no husband present, and 25.9% were non-families. 22.6% of all households were made up of individuals, and 9.4% had someone living alone who was 65 years of age or older. The average household size was 2.43 and the average family size was 2.82.

In the town, the population was spread out, with 19.6% under the age of 18, 6.0% from 18 to 24, 24.0% from 25 to 44, 30.8% from 45 to 64, and 19.6% who were 65 years of age or older. The median age was 45 years. For every 100 females, there were 105.5 males. For every 100 females age 18 and over, there were 106.9 males.

The median income for a household in the town was $39,479, and the median income for a family was $43,456. Males had a median income of $35,417 versus $18,750 for females. The per capita income for the town was $17,475. About 5.8% of families and 10.4% of the population were below the poverty line, including 13.8% of those under age 18 and 10.0% of those age 65 or over.

References

Towns in Chippewa County, Wisconsin
Eau Claire–Chippewa Falls metropolitan area
Towns in Wisconsin